Sittisak Tarapan (Thai สิทธิศักดิ์ ตาระพัน ) is a Thai footballer. He is currently playing for Army United in the Thai League 2.

References

External links
Profile at Thaipremierleague.co.th

Sittisak Tarapan
1984 births
Living people
Sittisak Tarapan
Sittisak Tarapan
Sittisak Tarapan
Sittisak Tarapan
Sittisak Tarapan
Association football wingers
Association football fullbacks